Pectis carthusianorum, the Caribbean cinchweed, is a summer blooming annual plant of the genus Pectis, found in Puerto Rico. It is also native to Cuba, Dominican Republic, Haiti, and Venezuela.

References

External links
Wolfram alpha entities - species - Caribbean cinchweed
Plants nursery - Asteraceae

carthusianorum
Flora of Puerto Rico
Flora without expected TNC conservation status